Hydrosmecta is a genus of beetles belonging to the family Staphylinidae.

The species of this genus are found in Europe and Northern America.

Species:
 Hydrosmecta abyssina Pace, 1986 
 Hydrosmecta angustissima (Wollaston, 1864)

References

Staphylinidae
Staphylinidae genera